The Government of the Northern Territory of Australia, also referred to as the Northern Territory Government, is the Australian territorial democratic administrative authority of the Northern Territory. The Government of Northern Territory was formed in 1978 with the granting of self-government to the Territory. The Northern Territory is a territory of the Commonwealth of Australia, and the Constitution of Australia and Commonwealth law regulates its relationship with the Commonwealth.

Under the Australian Constitution, the Commonwealth has full legislative power, if it chooses to exercise it, over the Northern Territory, and has devolved self-government to the Territory. The Northern Territory legislature does not have the legislative independence of the Australian states but has power in all matters not in conflict with the Constitution and applicable Commonwealth laws, but subject to a Commonwealth veto.

Since 13 May 2022, the head of government has been Chief Minister Natasha Fyles of the Labor Party, replacing Michael Gunner after his surprise resignation. As of 16 May 2022 the Northern Territory's government website is yet to update the official cabinet positions.

Legislative powers
Legislative power rests with the Legislative Assembly, which consists of the Administrator of the Northern Territory and the members of the Assembly. While the Assembly exercises roughly the same powers as the state governments of Australia, it does so by a delegation of powers from the Commonwealth, rather than by any constitutional right. This means that the Australian Parliament retains the right to legislate for the Territory, if it chooses to exercise it. Under the law granting self-government to the Territory, the Federal Cabinet can advise the Governor-General of Australia to overturn any legislation passed by the Assembly. (See also Electoral systems of the Australian states and territories).

Executive powers
The government consists of a Ministry appointed by the Administrator, from the elected members of the Assembly. The Administrator normally appoints the leader of the majority party in the Assembly as the Chief Minister. The other members of the ministry are appointed by the Administrator on the advice of the Chief Minister. The Northern Territory Government is a member of the Council of Australian Governments.

Current ministries

Source:

Proposed Northern Territory statehood

For many years there has been agitation for statehood. A referendum was held on the issue in 1998, but the proposal was narrowly rejected. This was a shock to both the Northern Territory and Commonwealth governments, for opinion polls showed most Territorians supported statehood. However, under s. 121 of the Australian Constitution, the terms of admission of new states are decided by the Commonwealth Parliament. The terms offered included an increase to three seats in the Senate from two.  The other states all have 12 senators. Alongside what was cited as an arrogant approach adopted by then Chief Minister Shane Stone, it is thought that many Territorians were reluctant to accept statehood on the offered terms.

See also 

Northern Territory of Australia Government Gazette
Local Government Areas of the Northern Territory

References

Notes 

 
1978 establishments in Australia